Senan Molony is an author as well as the Irish Daily Mail's Political Editor. He was formerly Deputy Political Editor for the Irish Independent. He broke the news of politician Michael Healy-Rae's Celebrities go Wild voting scandal, receiving the award for Scoop of the Year at the National Newspapers of Ireland's Journalism Awards. He also covered the Aengus Ó Snodaigh printer cartridge scandal.

Books
His first book, Celtic Mists (Phoenix, 1987) is a parody of Irish history.  The Phoenix Park Murders: Conspiracy, Betrayal and Retribution (Mercier, 2006) investigates the assassinations of Cavendish and Burke in the park in 1882. He authored The Irish Aboard Titanic (Mercier, 2000, 2012),  A Ship Accused (Cedric, 2002); The Titanic and the Mystery Ship (Mercier, 2004); Titanic: Victims and Villains (Tempus, 2008), RMS Lusitania: An Irish Tragedy (Mercier, 2004), and Titanic Scandal: The Trial of the Mount Temple (Amberly, 2010).

Theories
RMS Titanic alternative theories#Fire in coal bunker

References

External links 
 Description of the Phoenix Park Murders by author Senan Molony.

1963 births
Living people
Irish journalists
Irish Daily Mail people
Irish Independent people
Irish non-fiction writers
People educated at Belvedere College
Alumni of Dublin Institute of Technology